The 2022 Louisville mayoral election was the sixth quadrennial Louisville Metro mayoral election, held on November 8, 2022. Incumbent  Democratic mayor Greg Fischer is  term-limited and cannot seek reelection to a fourth term in office.

On February 14, 2022, mayoral candidate Craig Greenberg survived an assassination attempt. The suspected assassin was a racial justice activist seen at George Floyd protests in 2020, but it is unclear if the attempted assassination was motivated by political beliefs. Controversy ensued when the Louisville Community Bail Fund subsequently posted a $100,000 bond for his release.

On May 17, 2022, the primary election was held. Greenberg and Republican Bill Dieruf won their respective primaries and advanced to the general election in November. Greenberg defeated Dieruf in the election.

Democratic primary

Candidates

Nominee 
Craig Greenberg, attorney and businessman

Eliminated in primary

Tim Findley, Jr., pastor, activist, and community leader
Skylar Beckett Graudick, former police officer and lobbyist
Colin J. Hardin, restaurant worker
Sergio Alexander Lopez, businessman and U.S. Census Bureau clerk
David Nicholson, circuit court clerk
Shameka Parrish-Wright, Co-chair of the Kentucky Alliance Against Racist and Political Repression and manager of the Louisville Bail Project
Anthony Oxendine

Withdrawn
David James, President of the Louisville Metro Council (endorsed Greenberg)
Carla Dearing, businesswoman and entrepreneur

Declined
Sadiqa Reynolds, president and CEO of the Urban League of Louisville
Charles Booker, former state representative and candidate for U.S. Senate in  2020 (running for U.S. Senate) 
Morgan McGarvey, minority leader of the Kentucky Senate (2019–present), state senator from the 19th district (2013–present) (running for U.S. House)
Attica Scott, state representative from the 41st district (2017–present) (endorsed Parrish-Wright)
Barbara Sexton Smith, businesswoman and former member of the Louisville Metro Council from the 4th district (endorsed Greenberg)

Endorsements

Results

Republican primary

Candidates

Nominee 
Bill Dieruf, mayor of Jeffersontown

Eliminated in primary
Chartrael Hall, minister and community speaker
Philip Molestina, businessman and minister
Rob Stark Reishman, Jr.

Results

Third parties

Socialist Workers Party

Declared 
Margaret Trowe, activist and perennial candidate

Independents
Robert Eberenz
David R. Ellenberger
Taylor Everett
Martina Nichols Kunnecke
Manetta C. Lemkheitir
John Mace

General election

Results

References

External links
Official campaign websites
 Craig Greenberg (D) for Mayor
 Bill Dieruf (R) for Mayor

Louisville
Louisville
Mayoral elections in Louisville, Kentucky
November 2022 events in the United States